Tommy Albelin (born 21 May 1964) is a Swedish former ice hockey defenceman who is currently an assistant coach for Switzerland's national team. He also was world champion in 1987 and competed in the men's tournament at the 1998 Winter Olympics.

Playing career
Albelin has, over the course of a 24-year professional career, played a total of 952 games for three NHL teams: the Quebec Nordiques, the New Jersey Devils, and the Calgary Flames. Albelin was drafted 152nd overall by Quebec in the 1983 NHL Entry Draft. Before joining the club he played five seasons for Djurgårdens IF in the Swedish Elitserien, winning the Swedish championship in his first year (1982–83). Albelin left for Quebec upon the conclusion of the 1986–87 season. He played a year and a half for the Nordiques before being traded to New Jersey. It would be with the Devils that he would play 10 seasons for and win two Stanley Cups, in 1995 and 2003. In 1996, he was traded to Calgary, but he signed to play with New Jersey again in 2001. His best season was the 1988–89 season when he put up 37 points. Albelin announced his retirement from hockey on 29 July 2004, however the Devils re-signed him in December 2005 (abbreviating his retirement after he had practiced with the team as an unsigned player for nearly half the season). He finished out his final year in 2006 playing for the Devils.

Coaching career
On 25 July 2007, Albelin was hired by the New Jersey Devils as an assistant coach to head coach Brent Sutter.  It was his first NHL coaching job.

On 10 August 2010, Albelin was named assistant coach of the Albany Devils, the AHL affiliate of the New Jersey Devils. On 9 September 2014, following Scott Stevens' decision to step down from a coaching position in New Jersey, Albelin was promoted to be an assistant coach under Peter DeBoer in the 2014–15 season.

In July 2016, he was appointed as assistant coach of the Swiss men's national team.

Career statistics

Regular season and playoffs

International

Coaching statistics
Season  Team               Lge  Type        W - L - OT/SO
2007–08 New Jersey Devils  NHL  Assistant   46 - 29 - 7      
2008–09 New Jersey Devils  NHL  Assistant   32 - 16 - 3

References

External links
 
 2004 NHL Official Guide & Record Book 
 2005 NHL Official Guide & Record Book 
 Scott Stevens leaves Devils coaching staff, Albelin to replace

1964 births
Albany River Rats players
Calgary Flames players
Djurgårdens IF Hockey players
Halifax Citadels players
Living people
New Jersey Devils coaches
New Jersey Devils players
Ice hockey players at the 1998 Winter Olympics
Olympic ice hockey players of Sweden
Quebec Nordiques draft picks
Quebec Nordiques players
Ice hockey people from Stockholm
Stanley Cup champions
Swedish expatriate ice hockey players in the United States
Swedish ice hockey defencemen
Switzerland men's national ice hockey team coaches
Toronto Maple Leafs scouts
Utica Devils players